ECS may refer to:

Education 
 Education Commission of the States, in the United States
 Engleside Christian School, in Alexandria, Virginia, United States
 Etowah City School in Etowah, Tennessee, United States
 Evangelical Christian School, in Memphis, Tennessee, United States
 Evangelical Christian School (Fort Myers, Florida)
 Evansville Christian School, in Evansville, Indiana, United States
 Everett Christian School, in Everett, Washington, United States
 Miss Edgar's and Miss Cramp's School, in Westmount, Quebec, Canada
 School of Education, Communication and Society, King's College London, United Kingdom
 School of Electronics and Computer Science, University of Southampton, United Kingdom

Science 
 Electrochemical Society, a learned society
 Embodied cognitive science
 Endocannabinoid system
 Equilibrium climate sensitivity
 European Calcium Society

Technology 
 Amiga Enhanced Chip Set, a chipset used in several Amiga computers
 eComStation, a computer operating system based on OS/2
 Edinburgh Concurrent Supercomputer
 EDNS Client Subnet
 Elitegroup Computer Systems, a Taiwanese electronics firm
 Emergency communication system
 Enterprise cognitive system
 Entity component system, a software architecture pattern
 Environmental control system

Transport 
 Eccles Road railway station, Breckland, England (National Rail station code)
 Empty coaching stock, in rail transport
 Estuary Crossing Shuttle, a bus service in Oakland, California
 Metrovagonmash Ečs, a Russian multiple unit used in the Prague Metro

Other uses 
 East Coast Swing
 Écs, a village in Hungary
 Ecuadorian Sign Language
 European Solidarity Centre
 Ecuadorian sucre, a former currency of Ecuador 
 Emerald City Supporters, a supporters' group for the Seattle Sounders soccer club
 Entertainment Crew & Sport, a section of the Media, Entertainment and Arts Alliance, Australia
 Esports Championship Series